Burleigh is a suburb in inner Blenheim, in the Marlborough region of the South Island of New Zealand.

Ōmaka Marae is located in Burleigh. It is a marae (meeting ground) for the Tarakaipa hapū (sub-tribe) of Ngāti Apa ki te Rā Tō and includes Te Aroha o te Waipounamu wharenui (meeting house).

References

Suburbs of Blenheim, New Zealand
Populated places in the Marlborough Region